Târgoviște (alternatively spelled Tîrgoviște) is a city and county seat in Dâmbovița County, Romania.

Târgoviște was one of the most important cities in the history of Wallachia, as it was its capital between the early 15th and 16th centuries. At the 2011 census, the city had a population of 79,610 people, making it the 26th largest in the country.

Name
The name Târgoviște is a Slavic name which the city acquired in the Middle Ages. It is derived from the old Slavonic word for "marketplace", referring to the place rather than the market itself.

The name is found in placenames not only in South Slavic areas (Bulgarian Търговище, Serbian Трговиште and Croatian Veliko Trgovišće), but also in West Slavic such as Slovak Trhovište, Czech Trhoviště or Polish Targowica. Additionally, places with the same name are found in Romania, in the regions of Oltenia, Banat, and Moldavia.

The Romanian and Bulgarian towns with the same name are also twinned.

History

Early history

The area of Târgoviște which was first inhabited is located where the Saint Nicholas-Geartoglu Church and Stelea Veche Church stand today. It was in this place that the first fortifications were built: a small stone building surrounded by a brick wall and a moat, probably belonging to a local ruler. However, archaeological evidence is scarce and it is difficult to pinpoint exactly when it was erected.

Saxon colony

Another nucleus of the city was built by Saxon colonists from Transylvania, in the area where the Catholic Saint Mary Church is located, a church that was built during the early years of the colony. A local tradition says that the church was built in 1300. The colonists came around the end of the 13th century and the beginning of the 14th century, the same period that Câmpulung was colonized. There is archeological evidence that the land occupied by the new colonists had been previously inhabited by locals, which leads to the conclusion that it had been approved by the local ruler.

The colonists influenced the local administration, as Târgoviște was the only town in Wallachia that had Transylvanian organization features, having official titles such as birău and folnog, which are found in documents together with local officials, like vornic and pristav. The town had a night watch which was also known by a Latin term (viglu < vigilia) instead of the local terms such pază or strajă. Under Mircea the Elder (1383–1419), Târgoviște became the third capital of Wallachia.

After 1400, the town began to grow and become denser. In both the Saxon part (around the stronghold) and the Romanian part, there were several large dwellings with cellars and cocklestoves similar to those found in Central Europe. The wealth is also known based on the number of treasure troves discovered, the largest being a hoard of 6,284 silver coins, found in the Saxon part of the town. The town gravitated around the Saxon part, this being valid until the Saxon community began its decline during the 16th century.

Capital of Wallachia

In the 15th century, the capital of Wallachia was Curtea de Argeș, however, due to Târgoviște's economic growth, toward the end of the century, it became a secondary residence of the Wallachian hospodar. In 1396, Bavarian traveler Johann Schiltberger mentions both Curtea de Argeș and Târgoviște as capitals of Wallachia. While Mircea I lived in Curtea de Argeș, Michael I, Mircea's son and co-prince lived in Târgoviște, where he continued to live even as a single ruler. Dan II preferred Curtea de Argeș and he was the last hospodar to rule from that city, the court being finally moved to Târgoviște by Alexandru Aldea in 1431.

The compound was surrounded by stone walls and a moat and a new church and a tower had been built. Vlad III Dracula ("the Impaler") later added the Chindia Tower, now a symbol of the city.

Starting with 1565, for the next two centuries, the rulers alternated the capital between Târgoviște and Bucharest, often on political reasons, as the former was preferred by the rulers who were more friendly toward Transylvania and the King of Hungary. Throughout the 15th and 16th centuries, Târgoviște was a major trade hub, especially with Poland, Brașov, and Sibiu.

By the 16th century, the Romanians became majority in the city, as some Saxons left for Transylvania and others were assimilated. Greek merchants began to settle in the city, especially after 1500, while Greek monks settled in the nearby Dealu and Panaghia monasteries.

As the capital of Wallachia, Târgoviște faced numerous sieges and invasions. In 1395, it was sieged and set on fire by Bayezid I. In 1457, the townsfolk of Târgoviște were punished by Vlad III Dracula for their involvement in the assassination of his brother: the elite of the city were killed, while the young were sent to work at his Poenari Castle.

The Ottoman invasion of 1462 did not reach the city, being prevented by Vlad III through The Night Attack. In 1476, the city was taken by Stephen V Báthory following a fifteen-day siege intended to restore Vlad to the throne. Several other battles were fought near the city during the rules of Neagoe Basarab and Radu of Afumați.

In 1597, the Hajduks of Mihai Viteazul and Starina Novak fought and won a decisive battle against the Ottoman Empire in Târgoviște.

Decline
After the capital was finally moved to Bucharest during the rule of Constantin Brâncoveanu (1688–1714), Târgoviște lost its importance, decaying economically as its population decreased.

Modern history

Târgoviște was the site of the trial and execution of Nicolae Ceaușescu and his wife Elena on 25 December 1989 during the Romanian Revolution.

Geography
One village, Priseaca, is administered by the city.

Population
In 2011, there were 79,610 inhabitants. According to the 2002 census, 96.6% of the inhabitants were Romanians and 2.84% Roma people.

Transportation

Railway

Târgoviște is a railway node, with branches serving Titu (joining there the Ploiești and Pietroșița lines).

Today, the city is served by multiple stations:
Târgoviște (south-west of the town).
Romlux halt (north-west).
Teiș halt (former Târgoviște-Vest) (north).
Târgoviște Nord station (north-east).
Valea Voievozilor halt (east).

The railway station is open for both passenger traffic - with sales/reservation office and electronic ticketing machine - and merchandise traffic. Local halts serves the large industrial operators of the city - Mechel, Erdemir, .

Roads
Located at a crossroads of ancient trade routes, the city can be easily approached from all sides.

Also, a number of county roads pass the city:
 DJ 711 Târgoviște — Bujoreanca
 DJ 712 Târgoviște — Șotânga — Vulcana-Pandele — Brănești — Pucioasa
 DJ 718A Târgoviște — Dealu Monastery
 DJ 719 Târgoviște — Valea Voievozilor
 DJ 721 Târgoviște — Colanu — Văcărești — Perșinari — Gura Șuții — Produlești —Costești Deal

Public transport
In the city, public transport is provided by Public Transport and include bus and maxi-taxi. From 1995 until 2005, trolleybuses operated in the city. In 2005 public transport was developed and modernized, Public Transport becoming a passenger transport company in public-private partnership.

Twin towns – sister cities

Târgoviște is twinned with:

 Castellón de la Plana, Spain
 Căușeni, Moldova
 Corbetta, Italy
 Ciudad Real, Spain
 Gioia del Colle, Italy
 Guilin, China
 Karadeniz Ereğli, Turkey
 Kazanlak, Bulgaria
 Nefteyugansk, Russia
 Santarém, Portugal
 Targovishte, Bulgaria
  2nd district of Budapest, Hungary

Sport 
The city has one football club, FC Chindia Târgoviște which plays in the first tier of Romanian football, the Liga I.

Târgovişte is also home to Municipal MCM Târgovişte basketball club which competes in the Romanian League and the EuroCup.

Natives
Grigore Alexandrescu (1810–1885), poet
Vasile Atanasiu (1886–1964), general
 (1881–1943), actor
Ioan Alexandru Brătescu-Voinești (1868–1946), writer
Sorana Cîrstea (born 1990), tennis player
Cornel Dinu (born 1948), football player
Florin Pripu (born 1980), professional football player
Ion Heliade Rădulescu (1802–1872), writer, philologist, politician
 (born 1991), poet
Theodor Stolojan (born 1943), economist, politician
Matei Vlădescu (1835–1901), general and politician

Gallery

Notes

References

External links

 A presentation of the Medieval Princely Court of Târgovişteincludes 25 contemporary photos, 3 ancient images, 2 layouts, a reconstruction of the Court, bibliography and many other info (in Romanian and in English).
 Museums of Targoviste and of Dambovita county (in Romanian) 
 City Hall site
 Local Community Social Network

 
Cities in Romania
Capitals of Romanian counties
Former capitals of Romania
Populated places in Dâmbovița County
Localities in Muntenia
Market towns in Wallachia
Place names of Slavic origin in Romania